Márcio Almeida de Oliveira (born 16 May 1996), commonly known as Marcinho, is a Brazilian professional footballer who plays as a right back.

Club career

Botafogo
Born in Rio de Janeiro, Marcinho is a graduate of the youth academy of Botafogo. Although originally a midfielder, he switched to right back position ahead of the 2016 season. In the same year, he was promoted to the senior team. On 2 February, he made his first team debut in a 2–1 victory against Portuguesa RJ. On 1 March, his contract was extended till December 2018.

Marcinho could not play for the most of 2017 season due to an injury. At the beginning of the 2018 season, he became the first choice right-back of the club after the appointment of Alberto Valentim as the manager. With the club, he went on to win the 2018 Campeonato Carioca and scored during the penalty shootout in the final against Vasco da Gama. On 10 April, he contract was extended until the end of 2020.

Athletico Paranaense
On 28 March 2021, free agent Marcinho agreed to a one-year contract with Athletico Paranaense.

Pafos
On 25 June 2022, Pafos announced the signing of Marcinho on a free transfer.

International career
In September 2019 he was called up to the senior Brazil squad for a friendly match against Nigeria.

Personal life
On 30 December 2020, Marcinho became a suspect of a hit-and-run which resulted in the death of a couple in the Sernambetiba Avenue, Rio de Janeiro. He was driving above the speed limit, left without providing immediate assistance to the couple, and was supposedly drinking before the accident.

Career statistics

Honous
Botafogo
 Campeonato Carioca: 2018

 Athletico Paranaense
 Copa Sudamericana: 2021

References

External links
Botafogo profile

1996 births
Living people
Footballers from Rio de Janeiro (city)
Brazilian footballers
Association football defenders
Campeonato Brasileiro Série A players
Campeonato Brasileiro Série B players
Botafogo de Futebol e Regatas players
Club Athletico Paranaense players
Esporte Clube Bahia players